Pete Steinkopf is an American guitarist, songwriter and music producer who is a founder of the punk rock band The Bouncing Souls.

Career 
Steinkopf founded The Bouncing Souls in New Brunswick, New Jersey in 1989.  Since that time, the band released ten studio albums, two live albums, one compilation album, nine ep/singles and eight split releases. 
In 2010, with the Build & Burn album from The Loved Ones,  Steinkopf began his career in producing and engineering albums. Since then, he has worked with Brian Fallon of The Gaslight Anthem, Dave Hause, Beach Slang, Nathan Gray of Boy Sets Fire and The Menzingers.

Steinkopf primarily works out of his studio, Little Eden, as well as The Lake House studio, both in Asbury Park, New Jersey.

Discography

References

 The Bouncing Souls
 The Bouncing Souls reflect on 15 years of 'Hopeless Romantic'
 The 25 most influential people in New Jersey music
 https://marshallamps.com/artists/t/the-bouncing-souls-pete-steinkopf/
 http://riotfest.org/2018/03/beach-rats/
 https://www.culturecreature.com/beach-rats-band-interview/
 Smalltalk (members of Bouncing Souls, Worthless United) - "Holding Out" video premiere
 Smalltalk soars on 'Plus!' collection
 Seaside Caves, Hope, 2016
 Nathan Gray – As the waves crash down (Song) - that new music blog
 Lenny Lashley shines on 'Illuminator'
 Snowbird EP, by The Moms
 Luther announce 'Let's Get You Somewhere Else'
 Bouncing Souls - How I Spent My Summer Vacation
 Pete Steinkopf
 http://www.goingofftrack.com/2016/07/27/pete-steinkopf/
 http://www.audiomediainternational.com/recording/wsdg-designed-lakehouse-studios-goes-live/0587
 https://www.youtube.com/watch?v=kArZ_2GBMsU
 http://www.nj.com/entertainment/music/index.ssf/2016/08/the_25_most_influential_people_in_new_jersey_music.html
 Born to riff: The 17 greatest New Jersey guitarists
 https://www.punknews.org/review/13659/twopointeight-from-wires
 http://www.thevinyldistrict.com/asburypark/2011/04/recording-with-the-pete-from-the-bouncing-souls/
 https://noisey.vice.com/en_us/article/rank-your-records-the-bouncing-souls-pete-steinkopf
 https://https%253A%252F%252Fwww.google.com%252F/amp/s/journeyofafrontman.com/2015/06/16/on-the-line-with-pete-steinkopf-of-the-bouncing-souls/amp/
 http://www.allmusic.com/artist/the-bouncing-souls-m0000621101/biography
 https://www.punknews.org/article/44038/interviews-the-bouncing-souls
 http://dothebay.com/events/2017/4/22/cock-sparrer-off-with-their-heads-lenny-lashley-s-gang-of-one-suede-razors
 https://www.panicstaterecords.com/collections/the-scandals
 https://brianmcgeemusic.bandcamp.com/album/ruin-creek-2
 http://www.itsaliverecords.com/releases103.htm
 http://speakimge.com/tag/pete-steinkopf/
 http://thegiant.org/wiki/index.php/The_Bouncing_Souls
 https://www.punknews.org/article/48476/luther-announce-lets-get-you-somewhere-else
 http://www.nj.com/entertainment/music/index.ssf/2016/08/the_25_most_influential_people_in_new_jersey_music.html

Year of birth missing (living people)
Place of birth missing (living people)
Living people
American punk rock guitarists
American male songwriters
American record producers